Smerz is a Norwegian electronic music duo based in Copenhagen, Denmark. The two members, Catharina Stoltenberg and Henriette Motzfeldt, met at the University of Copenhagen and subsequently dropped out of school to pursue music.

Smerz signed to XL Recordings in 2017. In 2019 they announced US tour dates including a set at Pitchfork's Midwinter festival.

Stoltenberg and Motzfeldt have cited DJ Rashad and Rihanna as influences, as well as the television series Girls. Stoltenberg is the daughter of Jens Stoltenberg, a Norwegian politician and Secretary General of NATO.

Discography
Studio albums
Believer (2021)

Extended plays
Okey (2017)
Have fun (2018)

Singles
"The favourite" / "Rap interlude" (2020)
"I don't talk about that much" / "Hva hvis" (2020)
"Believer" (2021)
"Flashing" (2021)
"Remember" (2021)

References

Norwegian electronic music groups
Norwegian musical duos
Women in electronic music
XL Recordings artists